Vic Damone (born Vito Rocco Farinola; June 12, 1928 – February 11, 2018) was an American traditional pop and big band singer and actor. He was best known for his performances of songs such as the number one hit "You're Breaking My Heart", and other hits like "On the Street Where You Live" (from My Fair Lady) and "I Have But One Heart".

Life and work

Early life

Damone was born Vito Rocco Farinola in Brooklyn, New York, to Rocco and Mamie (Damone) Farinola, Italian emigrants from Bari, Italy. His father was an electrician and his mother taught piano. His cousin was the actress and singer Doretta Morrow. Inspired by his favorite singer, Frank Sinatra, Damone began taking voice lessons. He sang in the choir at St. Finbar's Church in Bath Beach, Brooklyn, for Sunday Mass under organist Anthony Amorello.

When his father was injured at work, Damone had to drop out of Lafayette High School. He worked as an usher and elevator operator at the Paramount Theater in Manhattan.

Career
Damone met Perry Como while at the Paramount Theater. Damone stopped the elevator between floors and sang for him. Como was impressed and referred him to a friend for an audition.  

He began his career at the New York radio station WHN when he was 17, singing on the Gloom Dodgers show, which provided light  entertainment to fans of the Brooklyn Dodgers. He changed his name at the suggestion of a regular on the show, comedian Morey Amsterdam. 

Damone entered the talent search on Arthur Godfrey's Talent Scouts and won in April 1947. This led to his becoming a regular on Godfrey's show. He met Milton Berle at the studio and Berle got him work at two night clubs. By mid-1947, Damone had signed a contract with Mercury Records.

His first release, "I Have But One Heart", reached number seven on the Billboard chart. "You Do" reached the same peak. These were followed by a number of other hits. In 1948, he got his own weekly radio show, Saturday Night Serenade.

He was booked into the Mocambo nightclub on the Sunset Strip in 1949, residing briefly at the Strip's famed Garden of Allah Hotel. In April 1949 he made his television debut on The Morey Amsterdam Show performing Cole Porter's "So in Love". In January 1950 he made his first of several guest appearances on Ed Sullivan's Toast of the Town, including a duet, the first of many, with the vocalist and future TV hostess Dinah Shore. Over the next 30 years he became a regular featured guest performer on every major variety series on network television. Among the programs on which he appeared are All Star Revue, Texaco Star Theatre with Milton Berle, The Arthur Murray Party, What's My Line?, The Jackie Gleason Show, The Steve Allen Show, The Perry Como Show, The Bell Telephone Hour, The Dinah Shore Chevy Show, The Garry Moore Show, I've Got a Secret, The Jack Paar Program, The Red Skelton Show, The Andy Williams Show, The Hollywood Palace, The Dean Martin Show, Hullabaloo, Mickie Finn's, The Danny Thomas Hour, The Jonathan Winters Show, The Carol Burnett Show, Della, The Tonight Show Starring Johnny Carson and several Bob Hope television specials.

In 1951, Damone appeared in two movies, The Strip, where he played himself, and Rich, Young and Pretty. From 1951 to 1953, he served in the United States Army where he spent a year in Germany with the 7729th Special Services Group and eight months at Fort Sam Houston, Texas. Before going into the service he recorded a number of songs that were released during that time. He served with future Northwest Indiana radio personality Al Evans and country music star Johnny Cash. After leaving the service, he married the Italian actress Pier Angeli (Anna Maria Pierangeli) in 1954 and made two movies, Deep in My Heart and Athena. In 1955 he played the Caliph in Kismet. In 1960, he played an effective dramatic role in the war film Hell to Eternity.

In 1955, Damone had one song on the charts, "Por Favor", which did not make it above number 73. However, he did have major roles in two movie musicals, Hit the Deck and Kismet. In early 1956, he moved from Mercury to Columbia Records, and had some success on that label with hits such as "On the Street Where You Live" (from My Fair Lady, his final pop top 10) and "An Affair to Remember" (from the movie of the same name). His six original albums on Columbia between 1957 and 1961 were That Towering Feeling, Angela Mia, Closer Than a Kiss, This Game of Love, On the Swingin' Side, and Young and Lively.

In 1961, he was released by Columbia. Moving over to Capitol Records, he filled the gap left by Frank Sinatra's leaving to help found Reprise Records. He lasted at Capitol only until 1965; however, he recorded some of his most highly regarded albums there, including two which made the Billboard chart, Linger Awhile with Vic Damone and The Lively Ones, the latter with arrangements by Billy May, who also arranged another of Damone's Capitol albums, Strange Enchantment. Other original Capitol albums included My Baby Loves to Swing, The Liveliest, and On the Street Where You Live.

Damone did limited acting on television in the early 1960s. He played Stan Skylar in the 1960 episode "Piano Man" of CBS's The DuPont Show with June Allyson. He was cast as Jess Wilkerson in the 1961 episode "The Proxy" of the ABC Western series The Rebel, starring Nick Adams. In 1962, he played the crooner Ric Vallone in the episode "Like a Sister" on the CBS sitcom The Dick Van Dyke Show, during which he sang "The Most Beautiful Girl in the World". In the summers of 1962 and 1963, Damone hosted a television variety series on NBC called The Lively Ones, which showcased current jazz, pop, and folk performers, as well as comedians. His group of musical guests over two seasons included Count Basie, Louie Bellson, Dave Brubeck, Chris Connor, Matt Dennis, Frances Faye, Ella Fitzgerald, Dizzy Gillespie, Buddy Greco, Woody Herman, Jack Jones, Stan Kenton, Gene Krupa, Peggy Lee, Nellie Lutcher, Shelly Manne, Anita O'Day, Ruth Olay and Oscar Peterson.

Damone's other notable television work during this time included three guest appearances from 1963 to 1964 on CBS's The Judy Garland Show. He also guested on UK television, among other programs on The Tommy Cooper Hour Christmas special in 1974. In addition to his solo performances, Garland and he sang duet medleys of songs from Porgy and Bess, West Side Story and Kismet.

In 1964, he sang "Back Home Again in Indiana" before the Indianapolis 500 car race.

In 1965, Damone next moved to Warner Bros. Records with the albums You Were Only Fooling and Country Love Songs. On Warner Bros., he had one top 100 chart hit: "You Were Only Fooling (While I Was Falling In Love)". The next year, he switched record labels again, moving to RCA Victor and releasing the albums Stay with Me, Why Can't I Walk Away, On the South Side of Chicago, and The Damone Type of Thing. In 1967, Damone hosted The Dean Martin Summer Show, which was rerun in 1971. In 1969, he released his last US chart record, a cover of the 1966 song "To Make A Big Man Cry", which made the Billboard Easy Listening chart.

Also in 1965, he appeared on the Firestone album series, Your Favorite Christmas Music, Volume 4, singing "It Came Upon A Midnight Clear" and "Have Yourself A Merry Little Christmas".

Later career
In 1971, Damone began performing in Las Vegas casinos and although he had to declare bankruptcy in the early 1970s, he was earning enough to ease his financial difficulties. He made concert tours of both the US and the UK, and recorded more albums for RCA Records. In the UK, he appeared on Tommy Cooper's Christmas Special television show in 1974.

In 1972, Damone was offered the role of Johnny Fontane in The Godfather after singer Al Martino, who had previously been given the role by producer Albert S. Ruddy, had the part stripped when Francis Ford Coppola became director and wanted Damone to portray Fontane. According to Martino, after being stripped of the role, he went to Russell Bufalino, his godfather and a crime boss, who then orchestrated the publication of various news articles that claimed Coppola was unaware of Martino being awarded the part by Ruddy. Damone eventually declined the role because of a salary dispute and also because he did not want to provoke the mob or anger Frank Sinatra, whom Damone profoundly respected. Ultimately, the part of Johnny Fontane was given to Martino.

In January, 1991, Damone appeared in a television commercial for Diet Pepsi first broadcast during Super Bowl XXV. Damone and other stars, including Jerry Lewis, Tiny Tim, Charo and Bo Jackson, attempt to sing Diet Pepsi's theme song, "You've Got the Right One Baby (Uh-Huh)", which was performed by Ray Charles.

Damone's final album was issued in 2002, while some of his previous albums were being repackaged and reissued. In 2003, Vic decided to issue some previously unreleased material and formed Vintage Records with his son, Perry Damone. He originally planned to issue a 7 CD series called The Vic Damone Signature Collection, and in May 2003 released Volume 1, produced by Perry and Frank Sinclair. In May 2004, Vic released his second CD in the Signature Series, again produced by Perry and Sinclair. After this disc was issued, Damone decided to cancel the release of the rest of the collection. During his entire career, Damone recorded over 2,000 songs. He garnered new fans following the launch of the Vic Damone website www.vicdamone.com, in 2002. The website was created by Damone's son Perry and Sinclair, and was ultimately managed by Damone's son-in-law, William "Bill" Karant.

On January 19, 2002, Damone made one of his final public performances at the Raymond F. Kravis Center for the Performing Arts in Palm Beach, Florida. Damone suffered a stroke later the same year and subsequently retired. Damone did, however, step out of retirement on January 22, 2011, when he once again performed at the Kravis Performing Arts Center in Palm Beach, to a sold-out crowd. He dedicated this performance to his six grandchildren, who had never seen him perform live. Damone stated that "I don't need the money ... But, you know, my six grandkids have never seen me on stage. It will be the first time. I will introduce them. It's going to be exciting for me. Before I die, I want them to have heard me perform at least once".

In Brett Ratner's movie Money Talks, Chris Tucker's character sees a commercial about Vic Damone and then pretends to be Damone's son. At the time, Vic's real-life son, Perry, had some laughs about that "15 minutes of fame," and made mention of it on his midday radio show on Phoenix radio station KEZ.

On June 12, 2009, Vic Damone released his autobiography titled Singing Was the Easy Part from St. Martin's Press. In the book, Damone claimed he had been held dangling out of a window of a New York hotel by a "thug". Damone claimed he had been engaged to the thug's daughter, but ended the relationship when she insulted Damone's mother. He wrote that his life was spared when, during a Mafia meeting to determine the singer's fate, New York mob boss Frank Costello ruled in Damone's favor.  

In 2010, Damone called Canadian crooner Michael Bublé talented but "cocky" and criticized him for smoking and drinking "straight alcohol" after a show, believing that it would damage his vocal cords. Bublé responded by saying that he knew what he was doing, but promising that from now on he would always mix his alcohol with soda or orange juice.

In 2020, Damone appeared in one of a series of interviews for the documentary Jay Sebring....Cutting to the Truth.

Personal life
Damone suffered a stroke in 2002 and another health scare in 2008. He recovered from both, and lived until 2018. Damone was married five times and divorced four:
 Pier Angeli (1954–1958), actress, singer (one son – Perry Damone, 1955–2014)
 Judith Rawlins (1963–1971) (three daughters – Victoria, Andrea and Daniella)
 Becky Ann Jones (1974–1982), entertainer
 Diahann Carroll (1987–1996), actress, singer
 Rena Rowan-Damone (1998–2016), fashion designer, businessperson, philanthropist

Damone had six grandchildren from his daughters (Tate, Paige, Sloane, Rocco, Daniella, Grant).

Damone's first wife, Pier Angeli, was previously in a well-publicized relationship with James Dean, but was forced to leave him to marry Damone, a move that garnered great media attention. It was reported that Dean had watched the wedding from across the road on his motorcycle, even gunning the engine during the ceremony, although Dean later denied doing anything so "dumb". Six years after divorcing Angeli, Damone was arrested on October 15, 1964, on Angeli's charge that he had kidnapped their 9‐year‐old son Perry (named for Perry Como) and taken him from New York to Los Angeles. He was released three hours later after having pled not guilty to being a fugitive from a kidnapping charge. At the same time, a California judge awarded him custody of Perry. However, Angeli ultimately gained custody of Perry and left Hollywood for her native Italy, taking Perry with her. Perry however returned to California after Angeli's death. Perry died of lymphoma aged 59, on December 9, 2014.

He married actress Diahann Carroll in 1987. The union, which Carroll admitted was turbulent, had a legal separation in 1991, reconciliation, and divorce in 1996.

Damone was raised Roman Catholic and served as an altar boy, claiming to have never found deep meaning in his original faith. In the late 1950s, he was introduced to the Baháʼí Faith by a drummer in his band. Damone said his rendition of "On the Street Where You Live" incorporates gestures meant to summon a sustaining vitality from ʻAbdu'l-Bahá. He officially joined the religion in the early 1960s.

Damone met his Polish-born wife Rena Rowan (born Irena Aurelia Jung on January 4, 1928, in Lida, then part of Poland) in 1996, after she asked him to perform at an event to raise money for her Rowan House charity in Philadelphia, which provides housing for homeless single women with children. Rowan, a breast-cancer survivor, was a clothing distributor who started the Jones New York clothing store chain in the mid-1970s.

Damone lived in Palm Beach County, Florida in his later years. In January 2015, Damone and Rena sold their La Casita home for $5.75 million. Damone and Rena moved to a smaller residence, a townhouse in the Sloans Curve Drive neighborhood of Palm Beach. She suffered a stroke in 2011. In 2013, Damone was involved in a tug-of-war in a Palm Beach County court with Rowan's two daughters, Nina and Lisa Rowan, for control over the destiny of Rowan and her fortune, which was reportedly worth more than $50 million. The court ultimately sided with Damone, ruling that Rena Rowan was capable of making her own decisions. Rowan died on November 6, 2016, at home in Palm Beach, Florida, from complications of pneumonia. She was 88.

Damone died on February 11, 2018, from complications of respiratory illness at the age of 89.

Awards
In 1997, Damone received his high school diploma from Lafayette High School in Brooklyn when officials with the school granted credits for life experience and asked him to give the commencement address, in which he advised students to "Have spiritual guidance. Don't lose God. There is a God. Trust me."

In 1997, Damone received the Sammy Cahn Lifetime Achievement Award from the Songwriters Hall of Fame.

Frank Sinatra said that Damone had "the best set of pipes in the business."

For his contribution to the recording industry, Damone has a star on the Hollywood Walk of Fame at 1731 Vine Street in Los Angeles, California.

In 2014, Damone received the Society for the Preservation of the Great American Songbook's first Legend Award in recognition of those who have made a significant contribution to the genre.

Hit records

References

External links
Archived Official Website
Vic Damone's autobiography from St. Martin's Press

VH1 pageon Vic Damone 
Songwriters' Hall of Fame page on Vic Damone

1928 births
2018 deaths
20th-century Bahá'ís
21st-century Bahá'ís
United States Army personnel of the Korean War
American Bahá'ís
American crooners
American male film actors
American people of Italian descent
Big band singers
Converts to the Bahá'í Faith
Former Roman Catholics
Mercury Records artists
Military personnel from New York City
Musicians from Brooklyn
People of Apulian descent
RCA Victor artists
Traditional pop music singers
Lafayette High School (New York City) alumni
Deaths from respiratory failure
United Service Organizations entertainers